Events in the year 2020 in Sweden.

Incumbents
 Monarch – Carl XVI Gustaf
 Prime minister – Stefan Löfven

Events
 11 March – The first deaths recorded during the COVID-19 pandemic in Sweden.
 25 March – The death toll of the COVID-19 pandemic in Sweden surpassed 100.
 30 March – The death toll of the COVID-19 pandemic in Sweden surpassed 250.
 3 April – The death toll of the COVID-19 pandemic in Sweden surpassed 500.
 9 April  – The death toll of the COVID-19 pandemic in Sweden surpassed 1 000.
 26 April – The death toll of the COVID-19 pandemic in Sweden surpassed 2 500.
 11 June – The death toll of the COVID-19 pandemic in Sweden surpassed 5 000.
 29 to 30 August – Riots broke out in the Swedish cities of Malmö and Ronneby.
 17 November - The free media Riks is launched.

Sport
 9 to 26 January – The 2020 European Men's Handball Championship is held in Malmö, Gothenburg and Stockholm (in addition to Austria and Norway).

Deaths

January
 

 1 January – Bengt Levin, orienteering competitor (b. 1958).
 3 January – Bo Winberg, guitarist (b. 1939).
 6 January
 Bernt Andersson, footballer (b. 1933).
 Arne Holmgren, biochemist (b. 1940).
 14 January – Jan-Olof Ekholm, crime fiction writer (b. 1931).
 20 January – Ulf Norrman, Olympic sailor (b. 1935).
 25 January
 Anne Kulle, actress (b. 1944).
 Holger Romander, civil servant, National Police Commissioner (b. 1921).
 31 January – Gunnar Svensson, ice hockey player (b. 1956).

February
 
 6 February – Ola Magnell, musician (b. 1946).
 9 February – Margareta Hallin, operatic soprano (b. 1931).
 17 February – Anna-Stina Wahlberg, Olympic diver (1952, 1956) (b. 1931).
 24 February – Olof Thunberg, actor (Winter Light, Bamse, Amorosa) (b. 1925).

March
 1 March  – Stefan Lindqvist, footballer (Halmstad, IFK Göteborg, national team) (b. 1967).
 6 March – Anne-Marie Berglund, writer (b. 1952).
 8 March
 Max von Sydow, actor (b. 1929).
 Anders Åberg, actor (Långt bort och nära, Kejsaren, Andra dansen) (b. 1948).
 10 March – Kurt Liander, footballer (AIK, IFK Stockholm, national team) (b. 1932).
 24 March – John Eriksson, footballer (Djurgården, national team) (b. 1929).
 26 March – Olle Holmquist, trombonist (James Last Orchestra) (b. 1936).
 27 March – Thandika Mkandawire, economist (b. 1940).
 28 March – Kerstin Behrendtz, radio presenter (b. 1950).
 29 March – Tomas Oneborg, photographer (b. 1958).

April
 
 
 
 
 1 April – Yvonne Schaloske, actress (Rederiet) (b. 1951).
 4 April
 Susanna Ramel actress (b. 1920).
 Börje Stattin, Olympic gymnast (1952) (b. 1930).
 8 April
 Siri Berg, abstract artist (b. 1921).
 Lars-Eric Lundvall, ice hockey player (Frölunda), world champion (1962) and Olympic silver medallist (1964) (b. 1934).
 10 April – Marianne Lundquist, Olympic swimmer (1948, 1952) (b. 1931).
 14 April – Kerstin Meyer, mezzo-soprano (b. 1928).
 15 April – Adam Alsing, television and radio presenter (Big Brother, Adam Live, Mix Megapol) (b. 1968).
 18 April
 Erik Belfrage, diplomat and banking executive (b. 1946).
 Lennart Jirlow, painter and scenographer (b. 1936).
 25 April
 Per Olov Enquist, author (born 1934).
 Gunnar Seijbold, photographer (b. 1955).
 29 April – Maj Sjöwall, writer (b. 1935).

May
 
 
 2 May – Jan-Olof Strandberg, actor (Wild Birds, Last Pair Out, Varning för Jönssonligan) (b. 1926).
 4 May
 Gunnar Larsson, sports administrator (b. 1940).
 Anna Mohr, archaeologist (b. 1944).
 5 May – Jan Halvarsson, cross-county skier, Olympic silver medallist (1968) (b. 1942).
 9 May
 Kristina Lugn, poet and writer, member of the Swedish Academy (b. 1948).
 Sven-Erik Westlin, Olympic weightlifter (1964) (b. 1934).
 14 May
 Berith Bohm, operatic soprano (b. 1932).
 Ingvar Ericsson, Olympic runner (1952, 1956) (b. 1927).
 15 May
 Claes Borgström, lawyer and politician, Equality Ombudsman (2000–2007) (b. 1944).
 Henrik Pontén, jurist (b. 1965).
 20 May
 Malin Gjörup, actress (Hello Baby) and operatic mezzo-soprano, cerebral haemorrhage (b. 1964).
 Karl-Göran Mäler, environmental economist (b. 1939).
 31 May – Carina Boberg, actress (b. 1952).

June
 
 2 June – Inga Edwards, actress (Raggare!, Wallander) (b. 1937).
 7 June – Jean Bolinder, author (b. 1935).
 8 June
 Tobias Berggren, poet (b. 1940).
 Lillemor Östlin, writer and criminal (b. 1940).
 10 June – Zoogin, racehorse (b. 1990).
 11 June – Colibrine Sandström, writer (b. 1928).
 15 June – Jan Peder Lamm, archaeologist (b. 1935).
 17 June – K. Anders Ericsson, psychologist and scholar (b. 1947).
 18 June – Ingegärd Fredin, freestyle swimmer (b. 1930).
 27 June – Mats Rådberg, singer (b. 1948).

July
 
 6 July – Juris Kronbergs, poet and translator (b. 1946).
 11 July – Tõnu Puu, economist (b. 1936).
 12 July – Henrik Ripa, politician, MP (2010–2014) (b. 1968).
 15 July – Ivar Genesjö, Olympic fencer (1964) (b. 1931).
 23 July
 Hassan Brijany, actor (b. 1961).
 Ove König, Olympic speed skater (1972) (b. 1950).
 25 July – Jim Frick, horse harness racer (b. 1951).
 30 July – Ann Bergman, academic (b. 1963).

August
 
 9 August – Göran Forsmark, actor (The Hunters) (b. 1955).
 17 August – Folke Alnevik, sprinter, Olympic bronze medallist (1948) (b. 1919).
 18 August – Hans Cavalli-Björkman, lawyer and football club chairman (Malmö FF), 1975–1998 (b. 1928).
 23 August – Rolf Gohs, comic creator and cover artist (Fantomen) (b. 1933).
 25 August – Roine Carlsson, politician, Minister of Defence 1985–1991 (b. 1937).
 28 August
 Gudrun Arenander, Olympic discus thrower (1948) and handball player (b. 1921).
 Assar Lindbeck, economist (b. 1930).

September
 
 4 September – Carl-Henning Wijkmark, novelist (Stundande natten) (b. 1934).
 6 September
 Lennart Forsberg, footballer (GIF Sundsvall, Djurgården) (b. 1928).
 Anita Lindblom, singer and actress (b. 1937).
 13 September – Lars Idermark, businessman (PostNord, Swedbank, Kooperativa Förbundet) (b. 1957).
 17 September – Birger Folke, tennis player and television commentator (b. 1936).
 20 September – Dan Olweus, psychologist (b. 1931).
 21 September
 Lars-Åke Lagrell, sports personality, Governor of Kronoberg County (2002–2006) (b. 1940).
 Sune Wehlin, Olympic modern pentathlete (1948) (b. 1923).
 22 September – Agne Simonsson, footballer and manager (b. 1935).

October
 
 
 1 October – Maud Hansson, actress (Emil i Lönneberga) (b. 1937).
 15 October – Sonja Edström, cross-country skier, Olympic champion (1960) and bronze medalist (1956) (b. 1930).
 17 October – Erland Brand, painter (b. 1922).
 19 October – Järvsöfaks, racehorse (b. 1994).
 28 October – Anthony van den Pol, neurosurgeon (b. 1949).
 30 October
 Anders Hansson, racewalker (b. 1992).
 Jan Myrdal, author and political activist (b. 1927).

November
 10 November – Sven Wollter, actor (The Sacrifice, The Man on the Roof, A Song for Martin) (b. 1934).
 14 November – Kay Wiestål, entrepreneur (Victoria Day) and footballer (Djurgårdens IF) (b. 1940).
 18 November – Thore Göran Andersson, Olympic sailor (1960) (b. 1939).

December
 
 2 December – Karin Lindberg, gymnast, Olympic champion (1952) (b. 1929).
 17 December
 Hacke Björksten, jazz bandleader and saxophonist (b. 1934).
 Pelle Svensson, wrestler and lawyer, Olympic silver medallist (1964) (b. 1943).
 19 December – Märta Norberg, Olympic cross-country skier (1952) (b. 1922).
 20 December – Yvonne Sandberg-Fries, politician, MEP (2003–2004), MR (1982–1996) (b. 1950).
 24 December
 Roland Cedermark, musician (b. 1938).
 Siv Widerberg, writer and journalist (b. 1931).
 25 December – Arne Skotte, footballer (b. 1950).
 27 December – Rolf Aggestam, poet and translator (b. 1941).
 29 December – Gösta Linderholm, singer and composer (Rasmus på luffen) (b. 1941).

References

 
2020s in Sweden
Years of the 21st century in Sweden
Sweden
Sweden